Avi Yehiel, (born 26 September 1979) is a former Israeli footballer.

Biography
In 2012, Yehiel married Adi Newmann, the sister of the founder and former CEO of WeWork, Adam Neumann. After retiring from football in 2013, he worked for WeWork as a wellness coach.

Sports career
Avi Yehiel first played in Gadna Tel Aviv Yehuda junior team and won with it in the youth national championship. In 1997–1998 went to Hapoel Petah Tikva and played for the first time against Hapoel Tel Aviv FC. Yehiel played in Hapoel Petah Tikva for eight seasons and won the Toto Cup in 2004–2005. In season 2005–2006 went to Maccabi Tel Aviv FC, and scored the equaliser in his first game.

Avi Yehiel was a player at the Israel national football team. In his first appearance against Ireland, he scored the equaliser in the 2–2 match.

Honours
Toto Cup (2):
2004–05, 2008–09

References

External links
 

1979 births
Living people
Israeli footballers
Gadna Tel Aviv Yehuda F.C. players
Hapoel Petah Tikva F.C. players
Maccabi Tel Aviv F.C. players
Maccabi Petah Tikva F.C. players
Hapoel Be'er Sheva F.C. players
Association football defenders
Israel international footballers
Liga Leumit players
Israeli Premier League players
Footballers from Jaffa